The 1961 World Archery Championships was the 21st edition of the event. It was held in Oslo, Norway on 10–13 August 1961 and was organised by World Archery Federation (FITA).

Medals summary

Recurve

Medals table

References

External links
 World Archery website
 Complete results

World Championship
A
World Archery Championships
1961 in Norwegian sport
International sports competitions in Oslo
1960s in Oslo